Acacia burrana is a shrub of the genus Acacia and the subgenus Plurinerves that is endemic to north eastern Australia

Description
Like many species of Acacia it has phyllodes rather than true leaves. The evergreen phyllodes have a narrowly oblanceolate shape that is infrequently narrowly elliptic.

Taxonomy
The species was first described by the botanist Leslie Pedley in 2006 as part of the work Notes on Acacia Mill. (Leguminosae: Mimosoideae), chiefly from Queensland as published in the journal Austrobaileya.

Distribution
It has a disjunctive distribution and is located in Occurs Petford, Herberton and Mount Garnet areas and the Lolworth and Great Dividing Range at the headwaters of Torrens Creek and the Cape River in North Queensland with another population found about  further south in the Cudmore National Park. It is also occasionally found along sandy banks of minor watercourses at lower elevations.

See also
 List of Acacia species

References

burrana
Flora of Queensland
Plants described in 2006
Taxa named by Leslie Pedley